The Funny Little Woman is a book "retold by" Arlene Mosel.  Released by E. P. Dutton, it was the recipient of the Caldecott Medal for illustration in 1973, and was illustrated by Blair Lent.

"The Old Woman who Lost her Dumplings" was the title of the original tale by Lafcadio Hearn, which Mosel had adapted.

Plot
The story is set in old Japan. It is about is a funny little woman (who is an old woman). She likes to laugh ("Tee-he-he-he") and makes dumplings out of rice.

One day, one of her dumplings rolls down a hole. The little old woman chases the lost dumpling and ends up in a strange place underground, lined with Jizo (guardian statues). The Jizos warn the old woman not to go after the dumpling because of wicked oni (monsters) who live there, but she does anyway. An oni grabs the old woman and takes her in a boat across a river to the house of the oni.

The oni forces the old woman to cook rice for them. They give her a magic paddle to make a full pot of rice from a single grain. Now the old woman is enjoying being busy serving them plenty of rice dumplings for dinner every day.

But months later, the old woman becomes homesick. One afternoon, she decided to return home. When the oni are not looking, the  old woman takes the magic paddle, and escapes on a boat on the river. Soon the monsters found that the  old woman was heading home. They want to stop the her. But they realize they cannot swim. So they drank all the river water.

When the water bed dries up, the boat gets stuck into the mud. The old woman (who was too worried to laugh) tried to run away. But she gets stuck too in the mud. When she struggles, the oni all laugh. But when they do, they accidentally release the water from their mouths back into the river. When the water comes back again, the old woman can finish crossing to the other side in the boat.

The old woman returns home. She makes many rice dumplings with the magic paddle and sells them to people, and becomes "the richest woman in all of Japan."

References

External links
 

1972 children's books
Caldecott Medal–winning works
Children's fiction books
American picture books
E. P. Dutton books
Japan in fiction
Picture books by Arlene Mosel
Books about Japan